A number of ships were named Duke of York

, built for the London and North Western Railway, sold in 1911
, built for the London, Midland and Scottish Railway, passing to British Railways and in service until sold in 1964

Ship names